HMS E5 was a British E-class submarine built by Vickers Barrow-in-Furness. She was laid down on 9 June 1911 and was commissioned on 28 June 1913. She cost £106,700. E5 was sunk, probably by striking a mine, on 7 March 1916.

Design

The early 'Group 1' E class boats were armed with four 18 inch (450 mm) torpedo tubes, one in the bow, one either side amidships, and one in the stern; a total of eight torpedoes were carried. Group 1 boats were not fitted with a deck gun during construction, but those involved in the Dardanelles campaign had guns mounted forward of the conning tower while at Malta Dockyard.

E-Class submarines had wireless systems with  power ratings; in some submarines, these were later upgraded to  systems by removing a midship torpedo tube. Their maximum design depth was  although in service some reached depths of below .

Service history
E5 experienced an engine room explosion on 8 June 1913, twenty days before commissioning, which resulted in thirteen deaths. A further three men were killed when there was an oil blow back into the starboard engine off St Ann's Head. The submarine depot ship  and Alligator carried the medical team out to meet E5 on her way into Pembroke Dock. Ten other men were seriously injured, although all civilian staff from Barrow were safe and unharmed.

In December 1913, E5 was part of the 8th Submarine Flotilla, based at Portsmouth as part of the Home Fleets

When war was declared with Germany on 5 August 1914, E5 broke off a refit to re-join 8th Submarine Flotilla at its war station in Harwich later that day.

The 8th Submarine Flotilla, including E5 was assigned to patrol in the east end of the English Channel during the passage of the British Expeditionary Force to France in early August. On 15–17 August 1914, the British Grand Fleet carried out a sweep in the North Sea towards Helgoland. E5 and sister submarine  were ordered to patrol off the mouth of the Weser river in support of this operation, while  and  patrolled off the Ems. On 16 August E5 encountered several German torpedo boats, which attacked E5, while the British submarine unsuccessfully attempted to torpedo one of the German ships. The next day a German submarine attempted to torpedo E5 which E5 managed to avoid before setting off for home. Early on the morning of 18 August, while still on their return journey, E5 and E7 spotted a four-funnelled cruiser. Believing that the unidentified ship was British, E5 challenged the cruiser, which provoked a violent response from what was actually the German cruiser , which, with the cruiser , was carrying out a sweep into the Hoofden in search for British blockading forces. Strassburg fired at the British submarines, which dived to safety.

On 14 April E5 torpedoed the German steamer Schwarzwald north of the Norderney lighthouse. German trawlers and aircraft drove off E5, allowing the damaged Schwarzwald to safely make port. E5s commanding officer, Lieutenant Commander C. S. Benning, was commended by the Admiralty for damaging Schwarzwald. On 3 May 1915 E5 was one of five British submarines lying off the German coast, when they were spotted by the German airship L9. The German airship dropped bombs on the British submarines, while E5 fired on L9 with her deck gun. E5 claimed to have hit L9 but the German airship was undamaged. L9 claimed to have sunk one of the British submarines, but while  was near-missed by L9s bombs, she too was undamaged.

On 25 September 1915 E5 torpedoed the German Sperrbrecher (auxiliary minesweeper) SP11, causing SP11 to be beached. Salvage attempts on the German ship were abandoned on 27 September. E5s crew was awarded prize money by the British Admiralty for the sinking of SP11.

Loss
E5 was lost on 7 March 1916 while rescuing the survivors of the trawler Resono, just north of Juist in the North Sea.

There were different theories about the reason for the loss of E5.  One theory was that she struck a mine, possibly after straying into a German minefield upon being sighted by the German light cruiser . Another theory attributed her loss to depth charge attack by torpedo boats escorting the battlecruiser .

In 2016 divers found the wreck of E5 off the island of Schiermonnikoog. Her hatches were open, which suggests that the crew had tried to escape. There was no sign of damage to her hull, indicating that she had not sunk as a result of enemy action.

Notes

References

Further reading

External links
 'Submarine losses 1904 to present day' - Royal Navy Submarine Museum

 

British E-class submarines of the Royal Navy
Ships built in Barrow-in-Furness
1912 ships
World War I submarines of the United Kingdom
World War I shipwrecks in the North Sea
Lost submarines of the United Kingdom
Maritime incidents in 1913
Maritime incidents in 1916
Ships sunk by mines
Royal Navy ship names